Zeniff is a minor but pivotal person in the Book of Mormon.  According to the Book of Mormon, his lineage is uncertain other than he came from a group of Nephites which included Nephites, Zoramites, and Mulekites.  He left Zarahemla with a large group of this merged tribe to go to the land of Nephi.  At the time of Zeniff's journey to the land of Nephi, it was inhabited by the Nephite's arch-enemies, the Lamanites.  Zeniff became the king of the group of Nephites with whom he went to the land of Nephi.

He is the first of three kings whose story is recounted in The Record of Zeniff. The record concerns a group of Nephites who returned for a time to the land of Nephi, were enslaved by the Lamanites, and ultimately escaped bondage by fleeing back to Zarahemla.

Lineage

Background
The Record of Zeniff contains a synopsis of the history of the Nephites up to the time of Zeniff. At the time of Zeniff, the Nephites were living in the land of Zarahemla and the land of Nephi was occupied by the Lamanites.

The Return to the Land of Nephi
After Mosiah's death, during the reign of his son, King Benjamin, an army of Nephites determined to return to the land of Nephi and "possess the land of their inheritance" (Omni 1:27). Zeniff was among this group. When they drew near to the land of Nephi, Zeniff was sent to spy on the Lamanites, so that their army could destroy them. After seeing the Lamanites, Zeniff felt that they should not be destroyed but that the Nephites should enter into a treaty with them. The (unnamed) leader of the Nephite army, "an austere and blood-thirsty man", viewed this report as treasonous and tried to have Zeniff put to death. Fighting broke out among the Nephites, "the greater part of their army was destroyed", and "those that were spared" returned to the land of Zarahemla (Mosiah 9:1-2).

After a short time, Zeniff, who describes himself as "over-zealous to inherit the land of our fathers" (Mosiah 9:3), gathered another group of Nephites and returned to the land of the Lamanites. This time Zeniff went to the king of the Lamanites and, pledging peace, persuaded him to let them stay in the land. The Lamanite king, Laman, gave them the land of Lehi-Nephi and the land of Shilom, after commanding the Lamanites in those lands to depart.

Contention with the Lamanites
The people of Zeniff lived peacefully for twelve years, but Zeniff began to realize that King Laman had deceived him and did not intend for them to live in peace, but intended to exploit them and take, by force, the goods they produced. At first the Lamanite aggressions were limited to small pillaging raids, but soon a major battle was fought, with the Nephites victorious. Another ten years of watchful peace followed, until the death of King Laman, when Laman's son and successor again tried to drive the Nephites out of their land, but the Lamanites were once again defeated.

An Uneasy Peace
After these two great battles, Zeniff realized that their continued existence among the Lamanites would always be precarious. He ascribes their success in battle to their faith in God, and exhorts his people to always be faithful, since God alone can continue to deliver them from the Lamanites. His people enjoyed an uneasy peace throughout the rest of his reign and for some time afterward.

Grant Hardy says:

Zeniff has a remarkable ability to see the good in others, for earlier record keepers [in the Book of Mormon] such as Enos and Jarom found nothing of value in Lamanite culture... Yet Zeniff, as a man of peace, argues that the Nephites should make a treaty with the Lamanites and regain the land of their inheritance through negotiation rather than conquest

Aftermath
After a reign of about forty years, Zeniff grew old and conferred the kingdom on his son, Noah. (Zeniff's death is not specifically recorded.) King Noah "did not walk in the ways of his father" (Mosiah 11:2), but was sinful and idle. He taxed the people heavily to support himself and his corrupt supporters. Though warned by the prophet Abinadi that if he did not repent he would be destroyed, he continued his wicked practices, killed Abinadi, and as was prophesied by Abinadi, King Noah was killed and his people were conquered by the Lamanites. Noah's son Limhi became king, but he was subject to the Lamanite king and his people were forced to pay a tribute of one-half of all their possessions to the Lamanites.

The people of King Limhi were ultimately rescued by Ammon, who journeyed from the land of Zarahemla, helped them to escape and led them back to Zarahemla.

See also

 King Noah
 Abinadi
 Limhi

References

 Book of Mormon (1981 edition)
 Hardy, Grant Understanding the Book of Mormon : a reader's guide

Book of Mormon people